The Extradition Act 2003 (c.41) is an Act of the Parliament of the United Kingdom which regulates extradition requests by and to the United Kingdom. The Act came into force on 1 January 2004. It transposed the European Arrest Warrant framework decision into British law and implemented the UK side of the controversial UK–US extradition treaty of 2003 before the treaty came into force in April 2007 after being ratified by the US Senate in 2006.

Provisions
The Act is divided into five parts.
Parts 1 and 2 deal with "category 1" and "category 2" territories respectively. While it is not mentioned in the Act, category 1 territories are all other member states of the European Union and Part 1 of the Act is the United Kingdom's implementation of the European Arrest Warrant framework decision. Part 2 of the Act is concerned with extradition to all other countries which have an extradition treaty with the United Kingdom.
Part 3 deals with issuing European Arrest Warrants from the UK and extradition requests.
Part 4 regulates powers of arrest, search and seizure regarding individuals subject to European Arrest Warrants and extradition warrants.
Part 5 contains miscellaneous provisions including extradition to and from British overseas territories.
The procedure used by the courts is set down in the Criminal Procedure Rules 2015, part 50.

Examination by Parliament
The Act has been examined in two reviews by Parliament.  The first in 2011 by Sir Scott Baker making a series of recommendations and the second examination by the House of Lords Extradition Law Committee in 2014.

As a result of campaigning and scrutiny by Parliament, several important amendments were made in 2014 in the Anti-social Behaviour, Crime and Policing Act 2014. These included proportionality under section 21A and decision to try or charge under section 12A.

Part 2 territories

Territories are designated as Category 2 territories both for the purposes of Part 2 of the Extradition Act, i.e. export extradition from the United Kingdom, and Part 3, i.e. import extradition to the United Kingdom.

These are the countries that the UK presently has extradition arrangements with:

Albania, Algeria, Andorra, Antigua and Barbuda, Argentina, Armenia, Australia, Azerbaijan, The Bahamas, Bangladesh, Barbados, Belize, Bolivia, Bosnia and Herzegovina, Botswana, Brazil, Brunei, Canada, Chile, Colombia, Cook Islands, Cuba, Dominica, Ecuador, El Salvador, Fiji, The Gambia, Georgia, Ghana, Grenada, Guatemala, Guyana, Hong Kong Special Administrative Region, Haiti, Iceland, India, Iraq, Israel, Jamaica, Kenya, Kiribati, Lesotho, Liberia, Libya, Liechtenstein, Macedonia, Malawi, Malaysia, Maldives, Mauritius, Mexico, Moldova, Monaco, Montenegro, Nauru, New Zealand, Nicaragua, Nigeria, Norway, Panama, Papua New Guinea, Paraguay, Philippines, Peru, The Republic of Korea, Russian Federation, Saint Christopher and Nevis, Saint Lucia, Saint Vincent and the Grenadines, San Marino, Serbia, Seychelles, Sierra Leone, Singapore, Solomon Islands, South Africa, Sri Lanka, Swaziland, Switzerland, Tanzania, Thailand, Tonga, Trinidad and Tobago, Turkey, Tuvalu, Uganda, Ukraine, United Arab Emirates, Uruguay, USA, Vanuatu, Western Samoa, Zambia, Zimbabwe.

References

External links
cps.gov.uk - the Crown Prosecution Service guidelines on extradition to Category 2 territories
The UK government guidance on extradition from Category 2 territories

United Kingdom Acts of Parliament 2003
Extradition in the United Kingdom
Extradition law
United Kingdom–United States relations